Club Deportivo Cudillero was a Spanish football team based in Cudillero, in the autonomous community of Asturias. Founded in 1950 and refounded in 2002, it held its home games at Estadio La Roja, which has a capacity of 2,000 spectators.

History
Cudillero was founded in 1950 and reformed in 2002 after disappearing in 1979.

On 10 October 2014, the club board communicated to the Royal Asturias Football Federation the club would not play the game of the round 8 of 2014–15 Tercera División against Caudal Deportivo, due to the non-payments to players and coaches. One week later, the club announced it would retire from the competition and it would be dissolved.

Club background
CD Cudillero (1950–77)
CD Marino de Cudillero (1980–92, refounded in 2014)
CD Pixueto (1994–2000)
CD Cudillero (2002–2014)

Season to season

9 seasons in Tercera División

References

External links
Unofficial website 
Futbolme team profile 

Defunct football clubs in Asturias
Association football clubs established in 1950
1950 establishments in Spain
Association football clubs disestablished in 2014